Auger de Balben (died c. 1163) was the third Grand Master of the Knights Hospitaller, holding the office from 1160 until his death. He succeeded Raymond du Puy. Many references list an Arnaud de Comps as Balben's successor, which some believe to be incorrect. His successor was Gilbert of Assailly.

Biography
Auger de Balben was believed to be born in Dauphiné, at Risoul, despite the absence of any trace in the Dauphinois armorials. He was a former companion-in-arms of Raymond du Puy whom he accompanied in 1157 to Saint-Gilles in 1157 and to Forez in 1158.

In 1160, Auger would have taken part in the Synod of Nazareth and would have pronounced himself as supporting the pope Alexander III against the anti-pope Victor IV. The date of Auger's access to the magisterium is also uncertain. The first document that has come down to us and that probably comes from Auger of Balben dates from 29 November 1160, and the last known act of his predecessor is from 25 November 1158. His magistracy was short-lived, the last mention is of March 11, 1162. He was succeeded by Gilbert of Assailly.

Arnaud de Comps
Some references list Arnaud de Comps as the successor to Auger and refer to him as the fourth Grand Master. He is today considered to be a master who never existed, his name having appeared in the chronological lists placed at the head of the statutes, but his rank continues to be kept in the lists of grand masters. See Arnaud de Comps in French Wikipedia for a complete discussion as well as a portrait.

See also

 Cartulaire général de l'Ordre des Hospitaliers
 List of Knights Hospitaller sites
 Langue (Knights Hospitaller)
 Flags of the Knights Hospitaller

References

Bibliography

Further reading 

 Auger de Balben. French Wikipedia.
Arnaud de Comps. French Wikipedia.
Liste des grands maîtres de l'ordre de Saint-Jean de Jérusalem. French Wikipedia.
 Eugène Harot, Essai d’armorial des Grands-Maîtres de l’Ordre de Saint Jean de Jérusalem.
Auger de Balben. SMOM.
Seals of the Grand Masters. Museum of the Order of St John.

1163 deaths
Knights Hospitaller
Grand Masters of the Knights Hospitaller
12th-century French people
Year of birth unknown